Louis Mesnier (15 December 1884 – 10 October 1921) was a French international footballer. He is primarily known for scoring the first international goal for France, which he accomplished in the team's first-ever match against Belgium in 1904. Mesnier finished his international career with 14 appearances and six goals. He also captained the team on four occasions. Domestically, Mesnier played for CA Paris and FC Paris. With Cercle Athlétique, he won the Coupe de France in 1920.

References 

1884 births
1921 deaths
French footballers
France international footballers
Association football midfielders